The 1946 Danish film Letter from the Dead is a serial-killer mystery-thriller-romance directed by Johan Jacobsen. It was entered into the 1946 Cannes Film Festival.

Cast
Eyvind Johan-Svendsen as Læge Arne Lorentzen
Gunnar Lauring as Arkitekt Poul Friis Henriksen
Sonja Wigert as Gerd Lorentzen
Inge Hvid-Møller as Frk. Steen
Axel Frische as Thorsen
Karin Nellemose as Vibeke
Preben Lerdorff Rye as Actor
Liselotte Bendix
Povl Wøldike
Paul Holck-Hofmann as Guard in Bunker
Per Buckhøj
Henry Nielsen as Tentholder at Dyrehavsbakken
Professor Tribini as himself
Carl Johan Hviid
Minna Jørgensen
Carl Johan Hviid

References

External links

1946 films
1940s Danish-language films
Danish black-and-white films
Films directed by Johan Jacobsen
Danish crime films
1940s crime films